Trichonotus is a genus of marine gobiiform fishes. Species of Trichonotus are distributed throughout the Indo-West Pacific. This genus is the only member of the family Trichonotidae.

Description
Trichonotus species have jutting lower jaws, five soft rays, and single pelvic spines. In males, the anterior rays on their dorsal fins may be extended. Their lateral lines run along the middle flank. On the back end of the lateral line scales is a deep, V-shaped notch. The type species is Trichonotus setiger.

Species
There are currently 10 recognized species in this genus:
 Trichonotus arabicus	J. E. Randall & A. B. Tarr, 1994 (Arabian sand-diver)
 Trichonotus blochii Castelnau, 1875 (Bloch's sand-diver) 
 Trichonotus cyclograptus Alcock, 1890 (Bengal sand-diver)
 Trichonotus elegans Shimada & Yoshino, 1984 (Long-rayed sand-diver)
 Trichonotus filamentosus Steindachner, 1867
 Trichonotus halstead E. Clark & Pohle, 1996 (Gold-bar sand-diver)
 Trichonotus marleyi J. L. B. Smith, 1936 
 Trichonotus nikii E. Clark & K. von Schmidt, 1966
 Trichonotus setiger Bloch & J. G. Schneider, 1801 (Spotted sand-diver)
 Trichonotus somaliensis Katayama, Motomura & Endo, 2012 (Somalian sand-diver)

References

 
Gobiiformes
Marine fish genera
Taxa named by Marcus Elieser Bloch
Taxa named by Johann Gottlob Theaenus Schneider